James William Carmichael (December 16, 1819 – May 1, 1903) was a Nova Scotia businessman and political figure. He represented Pictou in the House of Commons of Canada as an Anti-Confederate and then a Liberal from 1867 to 1872 and from 1874 to 1878. He represented Nova Scotia in the Senate of Canada from 1898 to 1903.

He was born in New Glasgow, Nova Scotia, in 1819, the son of James Carmichael, the town's founder, and attended Pictou Academy. He began work in his father's shipping and retail business and became owner during the 1850s. He built ships and also transported goods by ship. He was also involved in coal mining, the timber trade, a tannery and an iron foundry. Although he originally built wooden sailing ships, he later built steamers and pioneered the use and building of iron and steel ships in Nova Scotia. Carmichael was also a lieutenant-colonel in the local militia. He was elected to the House of Commons in 1867 as an opponent of Confederation, but joined the Liberals in 1869. He was reelected in 1874 and was named to the Senate in 1898, resigning shortly before his death in New Glasgow in 1903.

Electoral history

References
 
 

1819 births
1903 deaths
Anti-Confederation Party MPs
Canadian senators from Nova Scotia
Canadian shipbuilders
Liberal Party of Canada MPs
Liberal Party of Canada senators
Members of the House of Commons of Canada from Nova Scotia
People from New Glasgow, Nova Scotia